Totsuka (written: 戸塚) is a Japanese surname. Notable people with the surname include:

, Japanese footballer and manager
, Japanese physicist
, Japanese snowboarder

See also
Totsuka Station, a railway station in Yokohama, Kanagawa Prefecture, Japan

Japanese-language surnames